Kaho is a small village on the banks of Lohit River at an elevation of  on the India-China  LAC in Anjaw district of Arunachal Pradesh state in India. It is 580 km east of Itanagar, nearly 70 km north of district headquarter at Hawai, nearly 8 km south of India-China LAC, 30 km west of Diphu Pass near India-China-Myanmar tri-junction, and 10 km north of Kibithu. Nearest air connectivity is 30 km in the south at Walong airstrip in Walong. The village has an Indian Army check-post. Kaho will be projected as the first village of the country by team Discover FarEast with the help of district administration.

Demographics
Kaho is one of the seven villages of the Kibithoo block in Arunachal Pradesh's Anjaw district through which the river Lohit flows and divides the scenic region into the west and east banks. They are connected at several places by foot suspension and bailey bridges.

Kaho is inhabited by the Meyor community who are Buddhists by faith. According to the 2011 census, it has a total population of 65 residents and a literacy rate of 64.15 percent, which was lower than the 65.38 percent level for the entire state of Arunachal Pradesh. In Kaho Male literacy stands at 74.07 % while female literacy rate was 53.85 %.

In Kaho village population of children with age 0-6 is 12 which makes up 18.46 % of total population of village. Average Sex Ratio of Kaho village is 1097 which is higher than Arunachal Pradesh state average of 938. Child Sex Ratio for the Kaho as per census is 2000, higher than Arunachal Pradesh average of 972.

As per constitution of India and Panchyati Raaj Act, Kaho village is administrated by Sarpanch (Head of Village) who is elected representative of village.

The residents still continue to suffer from a lack of basic amenities. The village's health center remains shut and children have to attend the high school in Kibithoo, located around 5 kilometres away on the north bank of the Lohit river.

There is a monastery for the local Buddhist population.

Transport
The  proposed Mago-Thingbu to Vijaynagar Arunachal Pradesh Frontier Highway along the McMahon Line, (will intersect with the proposed East-West Industrial Corridor Highway) and will pass through this district, alignment map of which can be seen here and here.

By Air - The best way to reach Tezu is to fly to Dibrugarh (Mohanbari) and then board a cab or a bus for the onward journey.

By Train - The railway station nearest to Tezu is Tinsukia Station (about 120 km away), from where you can hire a taxi or board a bus to reach Tezu.

By Road - Tezu is well connected to all major cities of Arunachal via the NH 52. There are both government and private buses available from Tinsukia, Dibrugarh and Guwahati that go up to Tezu.

See also

 North-East Frontier Agency

References
Citations

Sources

Villages in Anjaw district
China–India border crossings